Dioctria rufipes, the common red-legged robberfly, is a species of robber fly in the subfamily Dasypogoninae of the family Asilidae.

Distribution
This species can be found in most of Europe (Austria, Belgium, Bulgaria, the Czech Republic, Denmark, Estonia, France, the Netherlands, the former Yugoslavia, Germany, Poland, Romania, Russia, Slovakia, Sweden, Switzerland, Hungary, Great Britain and Italy), in the Near East, and in the eastern Palearctic realm.

Habitat
This species mainly inhabit scrubby grassland, well wooded areas, woodland edge and hedgerows.

Description
These medium-large robber flies have a black head and hard piercing mouthparts. The antennal tubercle is well-developed above the eyes. The mesothorax is black, lightly pubescent, with inconspicuous longitudinal stripes. The abdomen is slender, dorsally wider towards the back. The front legs are completely orange-red, whereas the hind legs are mainly black. They show a complete stripe of pale, short and soft pubescence (tomentum) on the sides of the thorax (pleura), with an additional ventral stripe above middle coxa.

Biology
Adults can be found from May to July–August. These insects are predators on other insects. They mainly feed on parasitic wasps, ichneumonids, sawflies, empidid flies and a few small species (Phora, Oscinis, Opius species). The larvae develop as predators in the ground.

Gallery

References

External links
 Introduction to Robber Flies
 Photographic Atlas

Brachyceran flies of Europe
Asilidae
Articles containing video clips
Insects described in 1776
Taxa named by Charles De Geer